Alexei Alexandrovich Starobinsky (born 19 April 1948) is a Soviet and Russian astrophysicist and cosmologist. He received the Kavli Prize in Astrophysics  "for pioneering the theory of cosmic inflation", together with Alan Guth and Andrei Linde in 2014.

Early life
Starobinsky is a former student of Yakov Zeldovich at Moscow State University from where he earned a bachelor's degree in 1972. In 1975, he earned a PhD degree from the Landau Institute for Theoretical Physics of the Russian Academy of Sciences and is now a senior scientist at the institute. From 1990 to 1997, he headed the department of gravitation and cosmology and, from 1999 to 2003, he was the institute's deputy director.

In the 1970s, Starobinsky worked on the theory of  particle creation in the early universe and particle generation and radiation from rotating black holes (1973/74), a precursor of the theory of Hawking radiation. He was also, in 1979, a pioneer in the theory of cosmic inflation in the Russian scientific literature. The phase of inflation postulates that the universe size grew quadrillion times faster that the speed of light. Starobinsky worked on Starobinsky inflation, a modification to general relativity which attempts to explain inflation. In the American and western European physics literature, Alan Guth was considered a pioneer of the theory during the same time period.

Starobinsky was a visiting scientist in 1991 at the École Normale Superieure; in 2006, at the Institut Henri Poincaré; in 1994 and 2007, at the Yukawa Institute of the University of Kyoto; and, in 2000/2001, at the Research Center for the Early Universe at the University of Tokyo.

Starobinsky is a member of the Russian Academy of Sciences. In 2010, he was elected a Member of the German Academy of Sciences Leopoldina. In 1996, he received the A. A. Friedmann Prize of the Russian Academy of Sciences. Since 1991, he has been a co-editor of the JETP Letters; since 1992, the International Journal of Modern Physics D; from 1993 to 1996, Classical and Quantum Gravity; and, from 1989 to 1997, General Relativity and Gravitation.

Honors and awards
In 2009, Starobinsky and Viatcheslav Mukhanov won the Tomalla Prize, with Starobinsky cited for his contributions to the theory of cosmological inflation and specifically, for the calculation of the gravitational radiation generated in the inflationary phase of the universe. In 2010, Starobinsky received the Oskar Klein Medal. Starobinsky and Mukhanov received, in 2012, the Amaldi Medal and, in  2013, the Gruber Prize in Cosmology.

In 2014, Starobinsky, together with Alan Guth of the Massachusetts Institute of Technology and Andrei Linde of Stanford University, was a co-recipient of the Kavli Prize awarded by the Norwegian Academy of Science and Letters. In 2019, he received, together with Viatcheslav Mukhanov and Rashid Sunyaev, the Dirac Medal, (ICTP).

Political positions 
In February 2022, he signed an open letter by Russian scientists condemning the 2022 Russian invasion of Ukraine.

See also
 Starobinsky inflation

References

External links 
 Homepage 
 CV, pdf

1948 births
Russian astrophysicists
Russian cosmologists
Soviet astrophysicists
Soviet cosmologists
Moscow State University alumni
Academic staff of the Moscow Institute of Physics and Technology
Living people
Members of the German Academy of Sciences Leopoldina
Members of the Norwegian Academy of Science and Letters
Full Members of the Russian Academy of Sciences
Foreign Fellows of the Indian National Science Academy
Foreign associates of the National Academy of Sciences
Russian activists against the 2022 Russian invasion of Ukraine
Kavli Prize laureates in Astrophysics
Fellows of the American Physical Society